Charles W. Engelhard Jr. (February 15, 1917 – March 2, 1971) was an American businessman, a major owner in Thoroughbred horse racing, and a candidate in the 1955 New Jersey State Senate elections. He controlled an international mining and metals conglomerate, Engelhard, founded by his father.

Biography

Engelhard made his fortune in the precious metals industry, where he operated a company founded by his father, Charles W Engelhard Sr. During World War II, he served with the United States Army Air Forces and, in 1947, Engelhard married the widow Jane Mannheimer. Engelhard would adopt Mannheimer's daughter, Anne France Mannheimer, and eventually have four more daughters with his wife. Shortly before his death in 1971, Engelhard disposed of most of his South African businesses, selling them to Anglo-American companies.

Politics
Charles Engelhard was a major contributor to the United States Democratic Party and in the 1960 presidential election organized the National Committee of Business and Professional Men and Women for Kennedy and Johnson. In 1955, he ran for New Jersey State Senate against Malcolm Forbes in the "Battle of the Billionaires", but lost 19,981 to 19,611.

Engelhard represented John F. Kennedy at the coronation of Pope Paul VI.

Business
As a young man, Engelhard worked in a metals processing business which had been founded in 1902 by his German American father, Charles Engelhard Sr., dealing in platinum, gold, and silver. Upon the death of his father in 1950, Charles Engelhard inherited the family business. He substantially expanded operations to South Africa, South America and Europe and built it into one of the world's leading refiners of precious metals. In 1958, he consolidated the various operating companies into Engelhard Corporation and issued a public share offering on the New York Stock Exchange. In 1961, Time described him as, "one of the most powerful businessmen in South Africa".

As a result of his company's need for gold acquisitions from South African suppliers, Engelhard became a major investor in the country, acquiring gold, copper and coal mining ventures as well as investing in industrial concerns. He set up a publicly traded holding company in the U.S. that raised capital for investments in South African business. The company made investments alone and in conjunction with South African business tycoon Harry Oppenheimer, whose Anglo American company dominated the South African mining industry. Engelhard maintained a residence in South Africa and was elected to Anglo American's Board of Directors. At home, he was criticized by students at Harvard and Rutgers for indirectly supporting the country's apartheid regime. 

Engelhard Minerals had dealings with the silver empire of Nelson Bunker Hunt and W. Herbert Hunt and Japanese trading companies Mitsui and Mitsubishi through its trading arm Phillipp Brothers. The company remained very sizable for many years after Engelhard's death.

Philanthropy
Charles Engelhard supported numerous humanitarian and benevolent causes in South Africa, the United Kingdom, and the United States. The Engelhard Dam on the Letaba River in Kruger National Park is named in his honor in gratitude for donations to the South African National Parks Board.

The Charles Engelhard Foundation, headed by his wife after his death and by their children following her death in 2004, provides funding to a wide range of causes including education, medical research, cultural institutions, and wildlife and conservation organizations. It has made major donations to the Metropolitan Museum of Art where the Charles Engelhard Court can be found in its American Wing, built the library at Harvard University's John F. Kennedy School of Government, and has been a generous supporter of a number of University of Montana academic programs. In 1967, he and his wife donated an elaborate 18th-century Neapolitan crêche to the White House.

Cragwood Stables
Engelhard developed a love of Thoroughbred horse racing and became a major force in the industry with racing stables in England and South Africa, plus in Aiken, South Carolina where his Cragwood Stables was named for his estate in Far Hills, New Jersey. Primarily trained by future U.S. Racing Hall of Fame inductee, MacKenzie Miller in the U.S., he raced notable horses such as Red Reality, Assagai, Tentam, Alley Fighter, and the U.S. Champion sire, Halo. His best known South African horse was Hawaii who won a number of important races in that country until being brought to compete in the U.S. in 1969 where he won several Grade 1 stakes and was voted the 1969 Eclipse Award for Outstanding Male Turf Horse. Following his death, his widow donated a large collection of racing trophies that were won by Cragwood horses in the U.S. between 1962 and 1976.

Nijinsky
While Engelhard was very successful racing Thoroughbreds in the United States, he and his wife also maintained a residence in London and it was in England where he had his greatest achievements in racing. His horses won British Classic Races six times including the St. Leger Stakes in 1964, 1967, 1968 and again in 1970 when he won it for the fourth time with the horse that brought him international fame and made him that year's British flat racing Champion Owner. Purchased at Windfields Farm's annual yearling sale in Ontario, Canada, Nijinsky was sent to Ireland to be conditioned by Vincent O'Brien. The colt earned Champion Two-Year-Old honors for his undefeated 1969 racing campaign. The next year, en route to being voted European Horse of the Year, Nijinsky won the 2,000 Guineas, The Derby, and the St. Leger Stakes to become the first horse in thirty-five years to win the English Triple Crown, and only narrowly failed to win the Prix de l'Arc de Triomphe by a short head to Sassafras. A 1970 motion picture was made about the colt titled A Horse Called Nijinsky and a 2000 Sun newspaper poll voted him Britain's Horse of the Millennium.

Death
Engelhard died in 1971 in Boca Grande, Florida. His funeral mass was held on March 5 at St. Mary's Abbey Church at the Delbarton School in Morris County, New Jersey. Former president Lyndon Johnson acted as an honorary pall-bearer. Also in attendance were US senators Hubert Humphrey, Ted Kennedy, Mike Mansfield and Harrison A. Williams Jr., and former governors Robert B. Meyner and Richard J. Hughes.

Inspiration for Goldfinger
Engelhard is reported by numerous sources, including Forbes and  The New York Times, to have been the inspiration for the fictional character Auric Goldfinger in the Ian Fleming novel Goldfinger and the subsequent motion picture.

References

1917 births
1971 deaths
20th-century American businesspeople
American businesspeople in metals
American racehorse owners and breeders
Owners of Epsom Derby winners
United States Army personnel of World War II
New Jersey Democrats
People from Far Hills, New Jersey
United States Army Air Forces soldiers
20th-century American philanthropists